Camooweal Airport  is located  northeast of Camooweal, Queensland, Australia. The airport is operated by the Mount Isa City Council and is mainly used by the Royal Flying Doctor Service to support the operation of weekly medical clinics for the Camooweal community. The airport also functions as a base to land supplies and perform evacuations during emergencies such as flooding.

Facilities
Solar powered lighting for the runway and apron areas is available for emergencies at night. Arriving and departing aircraft coordinate movements using a Common Traffic Advisory Frequency as there is no control tower at the isolated airstrip. A Non-Directional Beacon navigational aid is located close to the airport.

See also
 List of airports in Queensland

References

Airports in Queensland
Camooweal